Cipu (Cicipu), or Western Acipa, is a Kainji language spoken by about 20,000 people in northwest Nigeria. The people call themselves Acipu, and are called Acipawa in Hausa.

Like most Benue–Congo languages, Cipu has a complex noun class system. It has a fairly complex phonology with lexical and grammatical tone, vowel harmony and nasalisation.

Virtually all Cipu speakers speak the lingua franca Hausa. Many also speak other nearby languages.

Classification
Cipu is part of the Kambari branch of the Niger–Congo languages.

The most recent published classification has Cipu as part of the Kamuku group of West Kainji along with Eastern Acipa. However more detailed studies have shown this to be unlikely.

Alternative names
The Ethnologue currently lists Cipu as 'Western Acipa'. However the name 'Western Acipa' is no longer used outside the Ethnologue, and a request has been made to change the entry. In Hausa, the language is referred to as Acipanci and the people as Acipawa.

Geographic distribution
Cicipu is spoken in Nigeria by approximately 20,000 people, split between Sakaba Local Government Area, Kebbi State and Kontagora Local Government Area, Niger State.

Dialects/Varieties
The Acipu themselves recognise seven distinct varieties of Cicipu. The dialect names are as follows (with the corresponding Hausa names in parentheses):
Tirisino (Karishen)
Tidipo (Kadonho)
Tizoriyo (Mazarko)
Tidodimo (Kadedan)
Tikula (Maburya)
Ticuhun (Kakihum)
Tikumbasi (Kumbashi)

Phonology
The most common syllable type in Cicipu is CV, although there are fairly strong arguments for N and CVN. A small number of noun and verb roots begin with a V syllable. Lexical tone contrasts are found in nouns e.g. káayá ‘house’ and káayà ‘bean’, but not in verbs (although grammatical tone is important for verbs).

Vowels

Cicipu has an asymmetric six-vowel system. All vowels can be long or short, and all have nasalised counterparts. There are four diphthongs: /ei/, /eu/, /ai/ and /au/.

Consonants
Consonant length is contrastive in Cicipu, e.g. yuwo 'fall' vs. yuwwo 'turn around'. Any consonant may be lengthened.

Vocabulary
A large number of Cicipu words are borrowings from the lingua franca Hausa. The pronunciation of many of these loanwords has changed to fit in with Cicipu phonology, in particular with respect to vowel harmony.

Writing system
Cicipu is not currently written, although a preliminary orthography proposal has been made, and a small number of trial books has been circulated.

See also 
 Journal of West African Languages

Further reading

References

External links
 Cicipu language website

Languages of Nigeria
Kambari languages